The 49th Rally Catalunya was the twelfth and penultimate round of the 2013 World Rally Championship, held from 24 to 27 October, 2013. Sébastien Ogier won the rally, his eight victory of the season.

Results

Event standings

Special Stages

Power Stage 
The "Power Stage" was a 26.48 km (16.45 mi) stage during the second leg of the rally.

Standings after the rally 

Drivers' Championship standings

Manufacturers' Championship standings

References 
 Rally Catalunya 2013 - juwra.com
 49. RallyRACC Catalunya - Costa Daurada 2013 - ewrc-results.com

External links

2013 World Rally Championship season
Rally Catalunya
2013 in Spanish motorsport